The Hatfield Archer Memorial Hospital is dedicated to the memory of Marietta Hatfield and Mary Archer, who started the construction in 1891. It is located in the town Rotifunk, Sierra Leone.

Hospitals in Sierra Leone